Filip Peliwo was the defending champion, but was no longer eligible to compete in junior tennis, and thus could not defend his title.

Gianluigi Quinzi defeated Chung Hyeon in the final, 7–5, 7–6(7–2) to win the boys' singles tennis title at the 2013 Wimbledon Championships. Quinzi won the title without dropping a set in the entire tournament. Quinzi was the second Italian ever to win the boys' singles title after Diego Nargiso who won the title in 1987.

Seeds

  Nick Kyrgios (third round)
  Nikola Milojević (quarterfinals)
  Alexander Zverev (third round, retired)
  Laslo Đere (quarterfinals)
  Kyle Edmund (semifinals)
  Gianluigi Quinzi (champion)
  Cristian Garín (third round, retired)
  Borna Ćorić (quarterfinals)

  Filippo Baldi (third round)
  Johan Tatlot (third round)
  Pedro Cachín (second round)
  Maxime Hamou (first round)
  Clément Geens (first round)
  Guillermo Núñez (first round)
  Frederico Ferreira Silva (first round)
  Wayne Montgomery (first round)

Draw

Finals

Top half

Section 1

Section 2

Bottom half

Section 3

Section 4

References

External links

Boys' Singles
Wimbledon Championship by year – Boys' singles